The  was an army of the Imperial Japanese Army during World War II.

History
The  army was formed on May 18, 1942 under the Japanese Eighth Area Army of the Southern Expeditionary Army Group for the specific task of opposing landings by Allied forces in Japanese-occupied Solomon Islands. It was initially headquartered on Rabaul and participated in the Guadalcanal and New Guinea campaigns of the South West Pacific theatre of World War II.

After General Hitoshi Imamura took over command of the Japanese Eighth Area Army the 17th Army was responsible primarily for the defense of Bougainville. It was trapped and cut off from reinforcements and re-supply during the Bougainville campaign (1943–45), and was forced to live off the land, hiding in jungle caves for most of the rest of the war.

List of commanders

Commanding officer

Chief of Staff

Notes

References

External links

17
Military units and formations established in 1942
Military units and formations disestablished in 1945